Gero Kretschmer and Alexander Satschko were the defending champions but chose not to defend their title.

Dustin Brown and Andrea Vavassori won the title after defeating Mirza Bašić and Nino Serdarušić 7–5, 7–6(7–5) in the final.

Seeds

Draw

References

External links
 Main draw

Tennis Napoli Cup - Doubles
2021 Doubles